Fan the Flame (Part 1) is the fifth studio album from dance music band Dead or Alive and was released in 1990. Epic Records released Fan the Flame (Part 1) in Japan only. The album remained an exclusive in this territory until the worldwide release of the Sophisticated Boom Box MMXVI compilation box set in 2016.

The album was a slight change in the band's musical style towards more melancholic lyrics and refined vocals from Burns.  The background vocals on "Total Stranger" were performed by British pop band Londonbeat and the London Community Gospel Choir provided backing vocals for "Unhappy Birthday".

The song "My Love's On The Line" was also recorded for the album and performed live in 1990 but went unreleased. In 2020 the master tape was discovered in Steve Coy's personal collection and the track released on the Invincible reissue set the next year.

A follow-up album, Fan the Flame (Part 2), also began recording in 1990 but was abandoned until posthumous completion in 2021.

An acoustic album Love, Pete was also made available during a US personal appearance tour in 1992 and was since widely bootlegged with the title Fan the Flame (Part 2): The Acoustic Sessions. Pete strongly criticized its subsequent distribution.

In Japan they released the singles "Your Sweetness (Is Your Weakness)" (JPN#3), "Unhappy Birthday" (JPN#14) and "Gone 2 Long" (JPN#18). The album peaked at number 27 on the Japanese Albums Chart.

Track listing

Personnel
Pete Burns – vocals
Peter Oxendale – keyboards
Steve Coy – drums, keyboards, bass guitar, guitars

Additional personnel
Billy Currie – electric viola
Tracy Ackerman – backing vocals
Londonbeat – male backing vocals
London Community Gospel Choir – additional backing vocals

Technical
Tim Weidner – co-producer
Mickey Mulligan – engineer

References

1990 albums
Dead or Alive (band) albums
Epic Records albums